The Fort Abraham Lincoln Foundation is a Bismarck, ND based IRS recognized 501(C)3 non-profit organization and a member of the The Northern Plains Heritage Alliance, a group of organizations that collectively work together to achieve correlative goals of heritage education of all through coordinated efforts to support the maintenance and promotion historically and culturally significant location throughout the Missouri River Basin in North Dakota. "FALF" continues efforts that support its original mission that began in the early 1980's with Fort Abraham Lincoln and has grown to include the financial, material, and organizational support of several other projects that are similar in spirit and purpose within the Northern Plains National Heritage Area, one of 55 areas nationwide that is officially recognized by the National Park Service as a National Heritage Area. 

Headquartered in Bismarck, ND, FALF maintains an address at 1700 River Road N. Bismarck, ND 58503. at a facility locally known as "The Landing". The Landing is home to all of the member organizations of the Northern Plains Heritage Alliance. These generally affiliated organizations include

 The Northern Plains National Heritage Area
 The Northern Plains Heritage Foundation
 The Fort Abraham Lincoln Foundation
 The Lewis & Clark Riverboat

The facility is also home to a Nordic-themed restaurant called The Huckleberry House.

References

External links 
Fort Abraham Lincoln Foundation

Charities based in North Dakota
Bismarck, North Dakota
National Heritage Areas of the United States